Tearstained is the second studio album by Finnish gothic metal band Charon.

Track listing 
 "Worthless" – 3:35
 "Sorrowbringer" – 4:44
 "4 Seasons Rush" – 4:05
 "Christina Bleeds" – 3:06
 "Deepest Scar" – 4:29
 "The Drift" – 2:35
 "Sin" – 3:38
 "Holy" – 5:01
 "Your Christ" – 3:16
 "As We Die" – 3:58
 "The Stone" – 5:45

Personnel 
 Juha-Pekka "JP" Leppäluoto – vocals
 Pasi Sipilä – guitar
 Jasse von Hast – guitar
 Ant Karihtala – drums
 Teemu Hautamäki – bass

Production
 Recorded by Juha Matinheikki at BRR-studios, Raahe in November 1999
 Mixed by Mikko Karmila at Finnvox-studios, Helsinki in December 1999
 Mastered by Mika Jussila at Finnvox-studios, Helsinki in December 1999
 Cover artwork and design by Niklas Sundin

2000 albums
Charon (band) albums